Jesup may refer to:

Jesup, Georgia
Jesup, Iowa

People 

Morris Ketchum Jesup, banker, philanthropist, president of the American Museum of Natural History and the Peary Arctic Club.
Thomas Sidney Jesup, American general

See also
 Jessup (disambiguation)
 Jessop (surname)
Jesup North Pacific Expedition